Bruce Beresford (born 16 August 1940) is an Australian film director who has made more than 30 feature films over a 50-year career, both locally and internationally in the United States.

Beresford's notable films he has directed include Breaker Morant (1980), Tender Mercies (1983), Crimes of the Heart (1986) and the multiple Academy Award winning Driving Miss Daisy (1989).

Biography

Early life
Beresford was born in Paddington, New South Wales, the son of Lona (née Warr) and Leslie Beresford, who sold electrical goods. He grew up in the then outer-western suburb of Toongabbie, and went to The King's School, Parramatta.  He made several short films in his teens including The Hunter (1959).

Sydney University
He completed a Bachelor of Arts majoring in English at the University of Sydney, where he graduated in 1964. While at university he made the short film The Devil to Pay (1962) starring John Bell and Ron Blair, It Droppeth as the Gentle Rain (1963) co-directed by Albie Thoms and starring Germaine Greer, Clement Meadmore (1963) with Bell and King-size Woman (1965).

Nigeria and England
Beresford then moved to England in search of film work. He could not break into the British film scene, so he answered an advertisement for an editing job in Nigeria, where he worked for two years, in Enugu.

He then returned to England and worked for the British Film Institute as a producer of short films by first-time directors, including Magritte: The False Mirror (1970) and Paradigm (1970).

Beresford directed the documentary Lichtenstein in London (1968) about Roy Lichtenstein, and Extravaganza (1968), Barbara Hepworth at the Tate (1970), The Cinema of Raymond Fark (1970), and Arts of Village India (1972).

Early feature films
Beresford returned to Australia to make his first feature film, The Adventures of Barry McKenzie (1972), which he also wrote with Barry Humphries. The film, produced by Phillip Adams, was a box office success in England and Australia, but Beresford later said making the film was a "mistake" because reviews were so bad that he had trouble finding other work.

Beresford directed a documentary for TV, The Wreck of the Batavia (1973) and did some other TV films, Poor Fella Me (1973), and Monster or Miracle? Sydney Opera House (1973). These were financed by Reg Grundy who also financed Beresford's second feature as director, Barry McKenzie Holds His Own (1974), a sequel to Barry McKenzie.

Beresford went to England to direct and co-write a comedy, Side by Side (1975) starring Humphries and Terry-Thomas; it was little seen.

Beresford says his career was at a low ebb when Phillip Adams "saved my life" by offering him the job of directing an acclaimed version of David Williamson's play Don's Party (1976).

Beresford directed an adaptation of The Getting of Wisdom (1977), also produced by Adams.

SAFC
Beresford signed a contract with the South Australian Film Corporation for whom he wrote and directed a thriller, Money Movers (1979), which was a box office disappointment. He did some uncredited directing on the SAFC's Blue Fin (1978), then co-wrote and directed Breaker Morant (1980). The latter film was a notable success at the box office and earned Beresford an Oscar nomination. It was widely seen in Hollywood and Beresford began to receive US offers.

Beresford directed The Club (1980), from another Williamson play, and Puberty Blues (1981).

Early US films
Beresford received an offer from EMI Films to direct Horton Foote's Tender Mercies (1983). Star Robert Duvall won a Best Actor Oscar for his performance and Beresford earned a Best Director nomination.

He followed it with King David (1985) starring Richard Gere which was a notable box office failure.

Beresford returned to Australia to direct The Fringe Dwellers (1986), co-written with his first wife, Rhoisin Beresford. In the US he directed Crimes of the Heart (1986) from the play by Beth Henley, did a segment of the film Aria (1987), and did the comedy thriller Her Alibi (1989) with Tom Selleck.

Driving Miss Daisy
Beresford directed Driving Miss Daisy (1989) with Morgan Freeman and Jessica Tandy, from a play by Alfred Uhry. It won the Academy Award for Best Picture, although Beresford was not nominated as director. The film was a commercial and critical success.

Asked if he minded not even being nominated for the Best Director Oscar for Driving Miss Daisy, Beresford said: "No, not at all. I didn't think it was that well directed. It was very well written. When the writing's that good, you've really just got to set the camera up and photograph it."

He directed Mister Johnson (1990) in Nigeria, with Edward Woodward; Black Robe (1991), an Australian-Canadian film based on the novel by Brian Moore; Rich in Love (1992), co-written by Uhry; A Good Man in Africa (1994) with Sean Connery from a novel by William Boyd, which in 2015 Beresford called his worst film; Silent Fall (1994), which was nominated for the Golden Bear at the 45th Berlin International Film Festival; and Last Dance (1996) with Sharon Stone.

He wrote but did not direct Curse of the Starving Class (1994).

Beresford returned to Australia to direct Paradise Road (1997), which was a commercial disappointment. He directed a documentary, Sydney: A Story of a City (1999), then had a hit with the thriller Double Jeopardy (1999).

Later films
Beresford made Bride of the Wind (2001); Evelyn (2002) with Pierce Brosnan; and And Starring Pancho Villa as Himself (2003) with Antonio Banderas.

He spent several years looking for financing for various projects before making The Contract (2006) with Freeman and Cusack . He followed it with a TV film Orpheus (2006) and returned to Australia to make Mao's Last Dancer which also was filmed in Houston, Texas. (2009).

Beresford's later credits include Peace, Love & Misunderstanding (2011) with Jane Fonda, the documentary H.H. Dalai Lama: Essence of Mahayana Buddhism (2011), the mini series Bonnie & Clyde (2013), Mr. Church (2016) with Eddie Murphy, an episode of the remake of Roots (2017), the TV movie Flint (2017) and the Australian film Ladies in Black (2018).

Opera
In addition to films, Bruce Beresford has also directed several operas and theatre productions. In 2016, he directed Benjamin Britten's opera Albert Herring for the Queensland Conservatorium of Music, in a production conducted by Nicholas Cleobury.

He often works with film editor Mark Warner. (See: List of film director and editor collaborations)

In 2012, he directed a production of Erich Wolfgang Korngold's opera Die tote Stadt for Opera Australia.

In 2018, he directed the Australian premiere of Rossini's Otello for Melbourne Opera.

Memoir
In August 2007, he published a memoir, Josh Hartnett Definitely Wants To Do This... True Stories From A Life in the Screen Trade.

Personal life
Beresford's second wife is novelist Virginia Duigan, sister of film director and editor John Duigan. He has five adult children and now works both in Australia and the United States.

Contemporaries and friends
Beresford attended the University of Sydney with critic and documentary maker Clive James, art critic and aficionado Robert Hughes, activist and author Germaine Greer, journalist Bob Ellis, poet Les Murray, and writer Mungo McCallum. His contemporary and friend, actor and theatre director John Bell, shared a house and also did some film acting. Beresford remains close friends with Australian comedian, satirist and character actor Barry Humphries, best known for his on-stage/television alter ego Dame Edna Everage, and his family.

Filmography

References

External links 
 
 Conversation Hollywood Interview - James Pratt Interview with Bruce Beresford Season 1
 ABC interview transcript (Talking Heads, 1 October 2007, archived 2014)
 Bruce Beresford – portrait photo by Mark-Steffen Göwecke
 Bruce Beresford at the National Film and Sound Archive
 

1940 births
APRA Award winners
Australian film directors
Australian film producers
People educated at The King's School, Parramatta
University of Sydney alumni
Best Director Genie and Canadian Screen Award winners
Living people
People from Sydney